The Château de Saint-Hubert, also known as the Manoir de Saint-Hubert, is a château in Chavenon in the Allier department in the Auvergne Region of France.

History
The building was in origin a hunting lodge in the Bois de Sceauve belonging to the nearby Château de Laly in Le Montet. It was completely rebuilt as a full-scale château in the 19th century by the then owner, M. Pierre Camus (1845-1905), who also commissioned the landscape gardener François-Marie Treyve to create the surrounding park.

The building has been used since 2006 as a Russian Orthodox monastery.

Notes
Summed up and translated from the equivalent article at French Wikipédia, 31 October 2007

Houses completed in the 19th century
Châteaux in Allier
Russian Orthodox monasteries in France
19th-century architecture in France